Urshu, Warsuwa or Urshum was a Hurrian-Amorite city-state in southern Turkey, probably located on the west bank of the Euphrates, and north of Carchemish.

History
Urshu was a commercial city governed by a Lord (EN). It was an ally of Ebla and appears in the tablets as Ursa'um. Later it was mentioned in the inscriptions of Gudea (r. c.2144–2124 BC according to the Middle chronology) as the city where wood resins were procured. An old Assyrian letter that dates to the 19th century BC mentions a temple of the god Ashur in Urshu.

In the beginning of the 18th century BC, Urshu allied with Yamhad against Yahdun-Lim of Mari. Relations with Assyria were also strained, and men of Urshu were summoned by Yapah-Adad and his Habiru to attack the lands of Shamshi-Adad I of Assyria. The texts of Mari mentions a conflict between Urshu and Carchemish: the tribes of Upra-peans and Ra-beans attacked Urshu through the land of Carchemish, which caused Urshu to attack a contingent of Carchemishean troops and civilians that advanced along the bank of the Euphrates.

Later, Urshu became an economic rival to Yamhad and entered an alliance with Qatna and Shamshi-Adad I to attack Sumu-Epuh of Yamhad (r. c.1810-1780 BC). The death of Shamshi-Adad and the rise of Yarim-Lim I of Yamhad brought an end to this rivalry, as Yamhad was elevated into a Great Kingdom and imposed its direct authority over northern, western and eastern Syria, bringing Urshu under its sphere of influence without annexing it. The Tablets of Mari mention a few kings of Urshu who date to this era, including Shennam and Atru-Sipti, who visited Mari in the 12th year of its king Zimri-Lim.

Hittite conquest

The Hittite king Hattusili I attacked Urshu in his second year, laying siege to the city for six months. The Hittite king had 80 chariots and conducted his operations from the city of Lawazantiya (located in modern Elbistan district) in the Taurus foothills of eastern Cilicia.

Despite receiving aid from Yamhad and Carchemish, Urshu was burned and destroyed; its lands were plundered and the booty taken to the Hittite capital Hattusa.

The history of Urshu after the conquest is ambiguous. In the 15th century BC it appears in the Tablets of Alalakh as "Uris" or "Uressi", and is mentioned "Urussa" in the treaty between the Hittite Tudhaliya II and Sunassura II of Kizzuwatna as part of the latter's territory. The city again became part of the Hittite empire and was last mentioned in records dated to the final periods of that empire.

See also
 Hurrians
 Yamhad
 History of the Hittites

References

Citations

Hurrian cities
Former populated places in Turkey